Ahadabui was a legendary primate of the Church of the East, who is conventionally believed to have sat from 204 to 220.

Sources
Brief accounts of the life of Ahadabui are given in the Ecclesiastical Chronicle of the Jacobite writer Bar Hebraeus (floruit 1280) and in the ecclesiastical histories of the Nestorian writers Mari (twelfth-century), Amr (fourteenth-century) and Sliba (fourteenth-century).  These accounts differ slightly, and these minor differences are of significance for scholars interested in tracing the various stages in the development of the legend.

Although Ahadabui is included in traditional lists of primates of the Church of the East, his existence has been doubted by J. M. Fiey, one of the most eminent twentieth-century scholars of the Church of the East.  In Fiey's view, Ahadabui was one of several fictitious bishops of Seleucia-Ctesiphon whose lives were concocted in the sixth century to bridge the gap between the late third century bishop Papa, the first historically attested bishop of Seleucia-Ctesiphon, and the apostle Mari, the legendary founder of Christianity in Persia.

Life
The following account of the life of Ahadabui is given by Bar Hebraeus:

After Yaqob, Ahadabui.  He was given this name because of his striking similarity to his father.  Shortly before he died Yaqob instructed two of his disciples, Ahadabui and Qamisho, to go to Antioch, so that the patriarch of Antioch could consecrate whichever of them he chose and send him back.  They did so, and when they both arrived in Antioch they were lodged in the house of a certain believer.  But they were shortly afterwards denounced to the governor of Antioch as Persian spies, and were imprisoned in the house in which they were staying.  Ahadabui was able to flee to Jerusalem, but Qamisho and his host were arrested and crucified as spies.  When the patriarch of Antioch heard that Ahadabui was hiding in Jerusalem, he sent letters to the bishops of that region, asking them to lay hands on him and send him into the East.  They did so, and sent him to Seleucia.  Thereafter the Western bishops allowed the Eastern bishops to elect and consecrate a new leader after the death of the old one without him needing to go to Antioch, and wrote them a letter to this effect, that the grand metropolitan of the East might be proclaimed catholicus and patriarch; although the patriarch of Antioch was greatly displeased with the whole idea.  Ahadabui departed to the Lord after fulfilling his office for fifteen years, and was buried in the church of Seleucia.

This story is regarded patently fictitious, as the cuoinage 'patriarchate of Antioch' is a later attribution to the holder of the lineage, and not applied by the third century AD.  The legend of Ahadabui and Qamisho was probably concocted in the sixth century to buttress the claim of the Church of the East to be an autonomous and independent church.  The patriarch Joseph (551–67) is known to have forged much of the early history of the Church of the East, and he may have invented the story.

See also
 List of patriarchs of the Church of the East

Notes

References

 Abbeloos, J. B., and Lamy, T. J., Bar Hebraeus, Chronicon Ecclesiasticum (3 vols, Paris, 1877)
 Assemani, J. A., De Catholicis seu Patriarchis Chaldaeorum et Nestorianorum (Rome, 1775)
 Brooks, E. W., Eliae Metropolitae Nisibeni Opus Chronologicum (Rome, 1910)
 Fiey, J. M., Jalons pour un histoire de l'Église en Iraq (Louvain, 1970)
 Gismondi, H., Maris, Amri, et Salibae: De Patriarchis Nestorianorum Commentaria I: Amri et Salibae Textus (Rome, 1896)
 Gismondi, H., Maris, Amri, et Salibae: De Patriarchis Nestorianorum Commentaria II: Maris textus arabicus et versio Latina (Rome, 1899)

External links

Legendary primates of the Church of the East
3rd-century bishops
Bishops of Seleucia-Ctesiphon